Fort Woodbury was part of the Arlington Line, an extensive network of fortifications erected in present-day Arlington County, Virginia to protect Washington, D.C. from Confederate attack during the American Civil War.  Construction began on the Arlington Line in May 1861, shortly after war broke out, and accelerated after the Union's defeat at the First Battle of Bull Run in July 1861.

History
Fort Woodbury was a lunette with a 275-yard perimeter and 19 emplacements for 13 guns.  It stood in what is today Arlington's Courthouse neighborhood, near the current Arlington County Courthouse and atop one of Arlington's highest hills.  It was close to the current location of Fort Myer.  The fort is named for Major D.P. Woodbury, the engineer who designed and constructed the Line.

Woodbury Heights, a high-rise condominium built in the 1980s near the Fort Woodbury site, is also named for the fort.

A historical marker memorializes the fort's location and is located at North Court House Road and 14th Street North.  The marker's inscription reads:

"Immediately behind the present Court House stood Fort Woodbury, a Iunette in the Arlington Line constructed in August 1861. It had a perimeter of 275 yards and 19 emplacements for 13 guns. It was named for Major D.P. Woodbury, the Engineer who designed and constructed the Arlington Line."

References

References/External Links
Arlington Historical Society - Arlington Line
Arlington Historical Society - Military-use structures

Virginia in the American Civil War
Buildings and structures in Arlington County, Virginia
American Civil War forts in Virginia
1861 establishments in Virginia